George Foote Foss (September 30, 1876 – November 23, 1968) was a machinist, blacksmith, bicycle repairman and inventor from Sherbrooke, Quebec. He was the inventor of the Fossmobile, Canada's first successful gasoline-powered automobile which he manufactured in 1896.

Early life

Foss was born in Sherbrooke, Quebec, in 1876 to Edwin Sherrill Foss and Ellen Sophia. His parents had emigrated from New England and farmed in Stanstead. They moved to Sherbrooke, where his father became the city’s auction clerk. Foss was an entrepreneur at an early age. His first job was running up and down the streets of Sherbrooke, ringing a bell on auction day to help his father. At the age of twelve he was sweeping out the local post office. By age fourteen, he was transferring bags of mail from the local post office, to the Grand Trunk and Quebec Central Railways, with the help of a draft horse harnessed to a sleigh or buggy.

Career
 
Foss obtained electrical expertise, while apprenticing with Whitney Electrical Instrument Company. He learned how to assemble electrical instruments and wind electrical motors. About two years later, he joined the Stanley Electric Company in Pittsfield, Massachusetts, where he furthered his electrical experience.

Foss returned to Sherbrooke at the age of 18 and opened up his own shop, offering machining, blacksmithing, and bicycle repair. Foss’ first initiative was to engineer a 52-volt boat motor. This motor was mounted to the top of the rudder with a bicycle chain running to the propeller. He made thirty small storage batteries, which were stored under the seat. The motor was very quiet and worked well for him, as he traversed the Magog and St Francis rivers.

In 1896, Foss traveled to Boston, to purchase a turret lathe for his machine shop. He saw and rode in his first automobile there. It was an electrically driven brougham. After 30 minutes, the batteries in the car died. Upon returning to Sherbrooke, he began to design and build an automobile that would address the problem. He started with a chassis made of old bicycle frames. The Fossmobile's front mounted engine made maintenance easier and produced considerably less upward vibration through the seat. The gear shifter for the Fossmobile was mounted directly on the tiller style steering column, something that was not done by other manufacturers for another 40 years.
 
Foss never tried to market or mass-produce his automobile. He turned down an offer from a private investor who offered to finance the production of his automobile. In 1900, Foss met with Henry Ford who offered him a chance to help build a new company that Ford was trying to establish. Foss declined Ford's offer, because he thought Ford's automobile was inferior to the Fossmobile. Shortly after their encounter, Ford founded the Ford Motor Company.

In 1902, Foss moved to Montreal, and became an automobile salesman. He had distribution rights for the Crestmobile, which was manufactured in Cambridge, Massachusetts. In this role, he was also able to test-drive other makes and models as they came onto the market. He eventually had the opportunity to drive a Ford automobile for himself, and he remarked that it was indeed a well-made vehicle. In 1912, at the age of 37, Foss went back to working as a machinist. He opened a machine shop in Montreal and became a key contributor in the manufacturing of World War I parts. Foss retired in 1932 after a lengthy illness. He later purchased a steamship named "Island Queen", which he operated as an excursion boat on Lake Saint-Louis.

Recognition

In 1960, Foss became an honorary member of the Vintage Automobile Club of Montreal. That same year, he was also awarded an honorary membership to the Antique Automobile Club of America. He and Colonel Robert Samuel McLaughlin are the only two Canadians to have received this honor. On August 23, 1997, the City of Sherbrooke, Quebec, unveiled a stone monument near the original site of his bicycle repair shop.

Personal life
Foss married Gertrude Louise Maclagan in 1902 in Sherbrooke, Quebec. Foss died in Chateauguay, Quebec, on November 23, 1968, at the age of 92.

Further reading

 Recollections of Sherbrooke, The True Story of a Small Town Boy (George Foote Foss), Sherbrooke Daily Record (April 1954)

References

External links
Fossmobile official website

1876 births
1968 deaths
Canadian inventors
People from Sherbrooke